Manoj Kumar Shokeen (born 7 July 1967) is a leader of Bharatiya Janata Party and a former member of the Delhi Legislative Assembly. He has been president of Outer Delhi BJP since 2017. He served as MLA from Nangloi assembly from 2013 to 2014, defeating Bijender Singh of INC by about 11,000 votes in the election. He also served as a MLA from 2008 to 2013 from Mundka Delhi. He won 2008 MLA Election from Mundka with about 15000 votes against Prem Chander Kaushik of INC. He also served as municipal councillor from Nangloi from 1997 to 2002. He lost the election to Raghuvinder Shokeen of AAP in 2015.

A fake FIR with selfish motives and political gains  was lodged against him by his former daughter in law, which was quashed by Delhi high court on 21st April 2022.He was given a clean chit by the Delhi High Court.

References

1967 births
Living people
Delhi MLAs 2013–2015
Place of birth missing (living people)
Bharatiya Janata Party politicians from Delhi